The Voice of Poland (season 10) began airing on 7 September 2019 on TVP 2. It aired on Saturdays at 20:05 and 21:10.

For the second season in a row the coaching lineup was changed heavily with only Michał Szpak remaining as a coach for his third consecutive season. After only a year off Tomson & Baron returned for their eighth season while the other two coaches Kamil Bednarek and Margaret debuted on the show.

Alicja Szemplińska won the competition, marking Tomson & Baron's first win as a coach.

Coaches and hosts

On July 9, 2019, it was announced that Mam talent! runner-up Kamil Bednarek would become a new coach and the first coach to be announced for season 10. A week later, along with the announcement of the jury for The Voice Kids and The Voice Senior, it was confirmed that Margaret would also be joining the show as a new coach, alongside returning coaches Michał Szpak and Tomson & Baron. Meanwhile, Marcelina Zawadzka replaced Barbara Kurdej-Szatan as the show's new host, alongside returning presenter Tomasz Kammel and Maciej Musiał.

Teams
Color key

Blind auditions
Color keys

Episode 1 (September 7, 2019)

Episode 2 (September 7, 2019)

Episode 3 (September 7, 2019)

Episode 4 (September 14, 2019)

Episode 5 (September 14, 2019)

Episode 6 (September 14, 2019)

Episode 7 (September 28, 2019)

Episode 8 (September 28, 2019)

Episode 9 (October 5, 2019)

Episode 10 (October 5, 2019)

 by Anna Jantar
 by Bajm
 by T.Love
 by Baranovski
 by Kamil Bednarek
 by Antek Smykiewicz
 by Edyta Bartosiewicz
 by Kortez

The Battle Rounds

In this season, the stealing system from Season 7 was once again implemented. There is a notable change from this season. From this season, each coach could steal without limit. The battles therefore end with seven participants from each team advancing to the next stage.

Color keys

 by Hey
 by Mrozu
 by Skaldowie & Łucja Prus
 by Zalewski

The Knockout Round

Episode 14 (November 2, 2019)
Knockouts took place on 2 November 2019.

Color keys

 by Bajm
  by O.N.A.
 by Grażyna Łobaszewska
 by Andrzej Zaucha

Live Shows

Color keys

Episode 15 (November 9, 2019)

 by Mrozu
 by Bajm
 by O.N.A.
 by Püdelsi (orig. Piotr Szczepanik)
 by Edyta Bartosiewicz

Episode 16 - Quarter-Final (November 16, 2019)

 by Mrozu
 by Zbigniew Wodecki
 by Skubas
 by Anna Jantar & Zbigniew Hołdys
 by Bracia
 by Grubson

Episode 17 - Semifinal (November 23, 2019) 

 Ursine Vulpine (feat. Annaca) version

Episode 18 - Final (November 30, 2019)

 by Czesław Niemen
 by Bogusław Mec
 by Bajm

Results summary of live shows

Overall
Color keys
Artist's info

Result details

Team
Artist's info

Result details

Non-competition performances

References

The Voice of Poland
2019 Polish television seasons